Electron-beam freeform fabrication (EBF3) is an additive manufacturing process that builds near-net-shape parts. It requires far less raw material and finish machining than traditional manufacturing methods. EBF3 is done in a vacuum chamber where an electron beam is focused on a constantly feeding source of metal, which is melted and applied as called for by a three-dimensional layered drawing - one layer at a time - on top of a rotating metallic substrate until the part is complete.

History
The use of electron beam welding for additive manufacturing was first developed by Vivek Davee in 1995 as part of his PhD thesis at MIT. The process was referred to as electron beam solid freeform fabrication (EBSFF). A team at NASA Langley Research Center (LaRC) led by Karen Taminger developed the process, calling it electron beam freeform fabrication (EBF3). EBF3 is a NASA-patented additive manufacturing process designed to build near-net-shape parts requiring less raw material and finish machining than traditional manufacturing methods. EBF3 is a process by which NASA plans to build metal parts in zero-gravity environments; this layer-additive process uses an electron beam and a solid wire feedstocks to fabricate metallic parts. Future lunar or mars-based crews may be able to use EBF3 to manufacture spare parts on-site without relying on parts launched from earth, perhaps even mining feed stock from local soils. According to researchers at the NASA LaRC, the greatest potential for the process is in the aviation industry where enormous reductions in machining waste by-products should be achievable. Normally an aircraft builder might start with a 6,000-pound block of titanium and machine it down to a 300-pound part, leaving 5,700 pounds of material that needs to be recycled and using several thousand gallons of cutting fluid used in the process. According to Taminger, "With EBF3 you can build up the same part using only 350 pounds of titanium and machine away just 50 pounds to get the part into its final configuration. And the EBF3 process uses much less electricity to create the same part." 30 years ago.

Process
The operational concept of EBF3 is to build a near-net-shape metal part directly from a computer-aided design (CAD) file. Current computer-aided machining practices start with a CAD model and use a post-processor to write the machining instructions (G-code) defining the cutting tool paths needed to make the part. EBF3 uses a similar process, starting with a CAD model, numerically reducing it into layers, then using a post-processor to write the G-code defining the deposition path and process parameters for the EBF3 equipment. It uses a focused electron beam in a vacuum environment to create a molten pool on a metallic substrate. The beam is translated by the surface of the substrate while the metal wire is fed into the molten pool. The deposit solidifies immediately after the electron beam has passed, having sufficient structural strength to support itself. The sequence is repeated in a layer-additive manner to produce a near-net-shape part needing only finish machining. The EBF3 process is scalable for components from fractions of an inch to tens of feet in size, limited mainly by the size of the vacuum chamber and the amount of wire feedstock available.

See also.
Electron-beam additive manufacturing

References

External links 
 Video: EBF3 – Electron Beam Free Form Fabrication
 Electron Beam Freeform Fabrication for Cost Effective Near-Net Shape
 From Nothing, Something: One Layer at a Time
 Electron-Beam Free-Form Fabrication System
 Device like ‘Star Trek’ replicator is in the works

Electron beams in manufacturing
NASA programs
3D printing processes
2000 introductions
American inventions
2000 establishments in the United States